Pogonolycus elegans is a species of eelpouts (Perciformes fish in the family Zoarcidae). It is the type species of its genus. It is found in the Southeast Pacific and Southwest Atlantic.

References 

 Anderson, M.E., 1994. Systematics and osteology of the Zoarcidae (Teleostei: Perciformes). Ichthyol. Bull. J.L.B. Smith Inst. Ichthyol. 60:120 p

Lycodinae
Fish described in 1937
Fish of Argentina
Fish of Chile
Taxa named by John Roxborough Norman